The United Federated Forces of the Symbionese Liberation Army (commonly referred to simply as the SLA) was a small, American far-left militant organization active between 1973 and 1975; it claimed to be a vanguard movement. The FBI and wider American law enforcement considered the SLA to be the first terrorist organization to rise from the American left. Six members died in a May 1974 shootout with police in Los Angeles. The three surviving fugitives recruited new members, but nearly all of them were apprehended in 1975 and prosecuted.

The pursuit and prosecution of SLA members lasted until 2003, when former member Sara Jane Olson, another fugitive, was convicted and sentenced for second-degree murder during the SLA’s 1975 bank robbery in Carmichael, California.

During its existence from 1973 to 1975, the group murdered at least two people, committed armed bank robberies, attempted bombings, and other violent crimes including the kidnapping of newspaper heiress Patty Hearst. Its spokesman was escaped convict Donald DeFreeze, but Patricia Soltysik and Nancy Ling Perry were believed to share group leadership. The membership was majority white during its years of operation.

The SLA assassinated Marcus Foster, the black Superintendent of Oakland Public Schools, and wounded his deputy superintendent Robert Blackburn in November 1973. This murder alienated the SLA from the local radical community.

The SLA are widely regarded by American law enforcement as the first domestic terrorist group to rise on the political left. The group was made up overwhelmingly of white members from the beginning. After Thero Wheeler left in October 1973, disagreeing with plans for violence, DeFreeze was the SLA's only black member. Joe Remiro was Chicano, described as white in a February 1974 article in The New York Times. He had been active for a period in Venceremos before it disbanded in 1973.

Background and formation

Prison visits 
The SLA formed from people who met during prisoner outreach programs supported by the radical left-wing group Venceremos, active in the Palo Alto area, and the Black Cultural Association in Vacaville Prison, about 45 miles from Berkeley. Student volunteers from University of California, Berkeley, some recruited by grad student and professor Colston Westbrook from his classes in African-American linguistics, were encouraged to conduct prisoner outreach at Vacaville. Initiated in 1969 by black inmates, the program was intended to help educate inmates in a variety of classes and prepare them for life after prison. It also sponsored cultural events that were open to community attendees. This program attracted chiefly white student activists, including radicals who promoted discussions of political and social justice issues.

The idea of a South-American–style urban guerrilla movement, similar to the Tupamaros movement in Uruguay, combined with Régis Debray's theory of urban warfare and ideas drawn from Maoism, appealed to a number of people, including Patricia Michelle Soltysik (alias "Mizmoon").

DeFreeze escapes prison
The SLA formed after the escape from prison by Donald DeFreeze, who took the name "General Field Marshal Cinque". He had been serving five years to life for robbing a prostitute. DeFreeze took the name Cinque from the leader of the slave rebellion which took over the slave ship Amistad in 1839. DeFreeze escaped from Soledad State Prison on March 5, 1973, by walking away while on work duty in a boiler room located outside the perimeter fence.

DeFreeze has been accused by some sources of being an informant from 1967 to 1969 for the Public Disorder Intelligence Unit of the Los Angeles Police Department.

DeFreeze had been active in the Black Cultural Association while at the California Medical Facility, a state prison facility in Vacaville, California, where he had made contacts with members of Venceremos. He sought refuge among these contacts, and ended up at a commune known as Peking House in the San Francisco Bay Area.  

Venceremos associates and future SLA members Willie Wolfe and Russell Little, concerned with the potential for exposure through surveillance at the high-profile Peking House, arranged for DeFreeze to move in with their associate Soltysik to the relative anonymity of Concord, California. DeFreeze and Soltysik became lovers and began to outline the plans for founding the "Symbionese Nation".

Beliefs and symbols

In their manifesto "Symbionese Liberation Army Declaration of Revolutionary War & the Symbionese Program", co-founders Donald DeFreeze and Patricia "Mizmoon" Soltysik wrote: "The name 'symbionese' is taken from the word symbiosis and we define its meaning as a body of dissimilar bodies and organisms living in deep and loving harmony and partnership in the best interest of all within the body." They intended the political symbiosis to encompass the unity of all left-wing struggles: feminist, anti-racist, anti-capitalist, and others. They wanted all races, genders, and ages to fight together in a left-wing united front, and to live together peacefully.

The group adopted a seven-headed SLA hydra-like cobra symbol, using it as a logo. The SLA featured this image on their publications.

Murder of Marcus Foster
On November 6, 1973, in Oakland, California, two members of the SLA killed school superintendent Marcus Foster and badly wounded his deputy, Robert Blackburn, as the two men left an Oakland school board meeting. The hollow-point bullets used to kill Foster had been packed with cyanide.

Although Foster had been the first black school superintendent of any major public school system, the SLA condemned him in their flyers for his supposed plan to introduce identification cards into Oakland schools, calling him "fascist". But Foster had already gained support by the School Board to change the proposal. 

Some SLA members had mistakenly believed that killing Foster would gain support for them in the black community and help them recruit new members; instead they alienated most blacks and other leftists by this crime. Harry Reynolds, a deputy superintendent in the system, said those who published the flyers had “irresponsible flapping at the mouth.” In addition, he said "somebody didn't like this guy [Foster] bringing all these people together. They may have been jealous of the type of progress he was making.”

Robert Blackburn, who served for a time as acting superintendent, later discussed how off base the SLA was. "These were not political radicals," Blackburn said of the SLA. "They were uniquely mediocre and stunningly off-base. The people in the SLA had no grounding in history. They swung from the world of being thumb-in-the-mouth cheerleaders to self-described revolutionaries with nothing but rhetoric to support them."

On January 10, 1974, Russell Little and Joseph Remiro, other SLA founding members, were arrested during an armed encounter with police. After police found extensive SLA materials at a house they were renting, the two were charged with Foster's murder. Both men were convicted of murder in 1975 and sentenced to life imprisonment. Seven years later, on June 5, 1981, Little's conviction was overturned by the California Court of Appeal, and he was later acquitted in a retrial in Monterey County. Remiro remains incarcerated; his eleven parole requests have been rejected. 

Little later said that Soltysik had shot Foster, and Perry had shot Blackburn, aided by DeFreeze.

Kidnapping of Patty Hearst

After Remiro and Little were arrested, the SLA considered kidnapping an important figure in order to negotiate the release of their imprisoned members. The US Federal Bureau of Investigation (FBI) found documents at one abandoned safe house revealing an action was planned for the "full moon of January 7". The FBI did not take any precautions, and the SLA did not act until a month later.

On February 4, 1974, publishing heiress Patty Hearst, a sophomore at the University of California at Berkeley, was abducted from her Berkeley residence at Apartment 4, 2603 Benvenue Avenue. This was less than three months after a November 1973 San Francisco Chronicle story announcing the Hearst–Steven Weed betrothal. Their address had been published. The SLA choice of Hearst was for maximum news coverage of their action.

The SLA issued an ultimatum to the Hearst family, namely, that they would release Patty in exchange for the freedom of Remiro and Little. Law enforcement rejected this. The SLA demanded a ransom from the Hearsts, in the form of a food distribution program. The value of food to be distributed fluctuated: on February 23 the demand was for $4 million; it peaked at $400 million. Although free food was distributed, the operation was halted when violence erupted at one of the four distribution points. The crowds were much greater than expected, and people were injured as panicked workers threw boxes of food off moving trucks into the crowd. After the SLA demanded that a community coalition called the Western Addition Project Area Committee be put in charge of food distribution, it organized the distribution of 100,000 bags of groceries at 16 locations across four counties between February 26 and the end of March.

Conditions of the initial captivity of Patty Hearst
The FBI conducted an unsuccessful search as the SLA took refuge in a number of safe houses. Hearst later claimed she was subjected to a series of ordeals while in SLA captivity that her mother would later describe as "brainwashing". The change in Hearst's politics has been attributed to Stockholm syndrome, a psychological response in which a hostage exhibits apparent loyalty to the abductor. Hearst was later examined by specialist psychologist Margaret Singer, who came to the same conclusion.

Terence Hallinan, the first attorney who represented her, was planning to argue involuntary intoxication, a side effect of which is amnesia.

Hearst's attorney F. Lee Bailey used the Stockholm syndrome argument as part of the defense at trial. During Hearst's subsequent trial, her lawyer claimed that she had been confined in a closet barely large enough for her to lie down in; that her contact with the outside world was regulated by her captors; and that she was regularly threatened with execution. Hearst's lawyer contended that she had been raped by DeFreeze and Wolfe. Both died before Hearst's capture and trial. The SLA claimed to be holding Hearst according to the conditions of the Geneva Conventions.

The SLA subjected Hearst to indoctrination in SLA ideology. In Hearst's taped recordings, used to announce demands and conditions, on day thirteen of her capture, Hearst can be heard extemporaneously expressing SLA ideology. With each successive taped communiqué, as the group called them, Hearst expressed increasing support for the aims of the SLA. She eventually denounced her former life, her parents, and fiancé. She later claimed that at that point, when the SLA had ostensibly given her the option of being released or joining the SLA, she had believed she would be killed if she turned them down. She began using the nom de guerre "Tania", after Che Guevara's associate "Tania the Guerilla".

SLA actions while Hearst was a member

Hibernia Bank robbery
The SLA's next action was the armed robbery of the Hibernia Bank branch at 1450 Noriega Street in San Francisco, on April 15, 1974, as the group needed money. Two people were shot and wounded.

At 10:00 a.m. that morning, three armed SLA members rushed into the bank, including Hearst holding a rifle. Security camera footage of Hearst was carried internationally. In her memoir, Every Secret Thing, she denied having participated willingly in the robbery and said she was threatened by other members. The group got away with more than $10,000 in the robbery. (Hearst later pleaded guilty and was sentenced to seven years in prison on charges related to this. After two years in prison, President Jimmy Carter commuted the remainder of her sentence. President Bill Clinton gave her an official pardon.)

Move to Los Angeles and police shootout
The SLA believed it had to recruit new members and recognized that it had alienated the radical community in the Bay Area by assassinating Marcus Foster. Cinque suggested moving the organization to his former neighborhood in South Central Los Angeles, where he had friends who they might recruit. The SLA had difficulty getting established there. They relied on commandeering housing and supplies, generating resentment among the people who protected their secrecy and security. At this stage, SLA member Russell Little, who was being held in jail pending a trial, said that he believed the SLA had entirely lost sight of its goals. He believed they got sidetracked into a confrontation with the Los Angeles Police Department rather than educating the public in  a political dialogue.

On May 16, 1974, William and Emily Harris entered Mel's Sporting Goods Store in the Los Angeles suburb of Inglewood, California, to shop for supplies. While Emily made the purchases, Bill decided to shoplift a bandolier. When a security guard confronted him, Bill Harris brandished a revolver. The guard knocked the gun out of his hand and handcuffed William's left wrist. Hearst, on armed lookout from the group's van across the street, began shooting at the store's overhead sign. Everyone in the store but the Harrises took cover, and the couple fled the store, jumping into the van and escaping with Hearst.

The SLA abandoned the van, but because of the shoplifting and shooting, police examined the vehicle and found a parking ticket with their new safe house address on it. The rest of the SLA fled that house after seeing news coverage of the shooting at the sports shop. The SLA took over a house occupied by Christine Johnson and Minnie Lewisin, at 1466 East 54th Street. Among those in the house at the time was a 17-year-old neighbor named Brenda Daniels, who was sleeping on the couch.

Daniels recalls the events that night:

The next day, an anonymous phone call to the Los Angeles Police Department (LAPD) said that several heavily armed people were staying at the caller's daughter's house. That afternoon, more than 400 LAPD officers, under the command of Captain Mervin King, along with FBI agents, Los Angeles County Sheriff's Department (LASD), California Highway Patrol (CHP), and Los Angeles Fire Department (LAFD), surrounded the neighborhood. The leader of a SWAT team used a bullhorn to announce, "Occupants of 1466 East 54th Street, this is the Los Angeles Police Department speaking. Come out with your hands up!"

A young child walked out, along with an older man. The man said that no one else was in the house, but the child intervened, saying there were several people and they had guns and ammunition. After several more attempts to get people to leave the house, a member of the SWAT team fired tear gas projectiles into the structure. SLA members responded with bursts of automatic gunfire, and a violent gun battle began. The police were firing semi-automatic AR-15 and AR-180 rifles. The SLA members were armed with M1 Carbines that had been converted to fully automatic fire. Police also reported that the SLA had made homemade grenades from 35 mm film canisters, and had thrown them at responding officers.

During the shootout, police continued to fire dozens of tear gas grenades into the house, attempting to force out the SLA members. About two hours into the shootout, the house caught fire, probably due to an exploding tear gas canister. As the house began to burn, two women left from the rear and one came out to the front (she had come in drunk the previous night, passed out, and woken up in the middle of the siege); all were taken into custody, but were found not to be SLA members.

Automatic weapons fire continued from the house. At this point, Nancy Ling Perry and Camilla Hall came out of the house. Police later said they fatally shot Hall in the head as she aimed a weapon toward them; Perry was shooting at them, and they shot her twice. After Hall fell to the ground, Atwood pulled her body back into the house. Perry's body remained outside the house.

The rest died inside, from smoke inhalation, burns and gunshot wounds. The coroner's report concluded that Donald DeFreeze committed suicide by shooting himself in the side of the head. Atwood, Willie Wolfe, and Patricia Soltysik died of smoke inhalation and burns. After the shooting stopped and the fire was extinguished, police recovered 19 firearms—including rifles, pistols, and shotguns. It was one of the largest police shootouts in U.S. history with a reported total of over 9,000 rounds being fired (4,000 by the SLA and 5,000 by police). There were no casualties among law enforcement, firefighters, or civilians outside the house.

The SLA leadership was decimated: Donald DeFreeze (General Cinque), Patricia Soltysik (Mizmoon or Zoya) and Nancy Ling Perry had all died. The other dead were also founding members: Angela Atwood ("General Gelina"), Camilla Hall ("Gabi"), and Willie Wolfe ("Kahjoh", misspelled by the media at the time as "Cujo"), Perry's body was outside, but the others were all found in a crawl space under the house, which had burned down around them.

Area TV stations all covered the shootout and conflagration. They took advantage of new broadcasting technology, such as smaller portable cameras that made their mobile units more nimble. Holed up in a hotel in Anaheim the Harrises and Hearst watched the siege and destruction live from their room.

Return to the Bay Area
Emily and William Harris, a married couple who were founding members, remained at large as fugitives with Hearst. Claiming to lead the SLA, they later picked up a few more members and committed more crimes, including the 1975 armed robbery of a bank in Carmichael, California, in which a customer was killed. Most were apprehended in 1975 and brought to trial; most accepted plea deals and served several years in prison. As of 2017, all but one of the surviving SLA members have been released from prison. Joe Remiro remains incarcerated. Little said that Soltysik, Perry, and DeFreeze were the ones who shot Foster and Blackburn. They died in the 1974 shootout in Los Angeles.

Initially the Harrises and Hearst stayed in the Bay area. By early the next year, Bill and Emily Harris were leaders. They had taken refuge with Hearst for a period on the East Coast, where they were aided by former radical Wendy Yoshimura. The four returned to the Bay area and recruited siblings Steve and Kathleen Soliah, Kathleen's boyfriend James Kilgore, and Michael Bortin. Except for Yoshimura, who was Japanese American and born at the internment camp where her parents were held during World War II, all the new members were white.

Crocker Bank robbery
On April 21, 1975, the SLA members conducted an armed robbery of the Crocker National Bank branch in Carmichael, California, in the Sacramento area. During the robbery, Emily Harris discharged her shotgun and accidentally shot and killed customer Myrna Lee Opsahl, a 42-year-old mother of four children. Five SLA members were ultimately charged in this murder and robbery. Four pleaded guilty to reduced charges in early 2002.

Hearst capture, trial and conviction
After a long and highly publicized search, Hearst was captured on September 18, 1975, along with the Harrises, Steven Soliah, and Yoshimura; they had been found in San Francisco safe houses. In Hearst's arrest affidavit, she claimed that SLA members had used LSD to drug her and had forced her to take part in the bank raid. She was convicted of the Hibernia Bank robbery and sentenced to seven years in prison. After she had been in prison for 21 months, US President Jimmy Carter commuted the sentence to time served. She was pardoned by President Bill Clinton.  The Harrises were convicted for their part in the Hearst kidnapping and spent eight years in prison. Police allegedly consulted psychics in searching for Hearst.

On February 26, 1976, a Los Angeles county grand jury indicted Kathleen Ann Soliah on explosives and conspiracy charges. She was accused of planting pipe bombs under two LAPD squad cars in August 1975, intending to kill police officers in retaliation for the six SLA members who died in the May 17, 1974  shootout. The devices did not detonate.

Soliah went on the run, moving to Minnesota. She lived as a fugitive for 21 years, changing her name and creating a new upper-middle-class life under the alias Sara Jane Olson. She married a doctor and they had three daughters.

The FBI arrested Soliah/Olson in 1999 after a tip was received by the television show America's Most Wanted, which had twice aired her profile. She was prosecuted in Los Angeles by its deputy district attorneys. Before going to trial in 2001, she pleaded guilty to possession of explosives with the intent to murder and was sentenced to two consecutive terms of ten years to life. In negotiation of the plea bargain, she had been told that she would serve no more than eight years. She attempted to change her plea, telling the judge that she had pleaded guilty only because she believed she could not receive a fair trial for bombing charges after the 9/11 terrorist attacks. She said that she was innocent of the making, possessing, or placing of the pipe bombs. The judge refused her request.

The Opsahl murder/Crocker bank robbery cold case was finally pursued due to new evidence developed through the efforts of the Los Angeles deputy district attorneys, who had prosecuted Olson. On January 16, 2002, first-degree murder charges for the killing of Myrna Opsahl were filed against Sara Jane Olson, Emily Harris, William Harris, Michael Bortin, and James Kilgore in Sacramento. All were living "above ground" and were quickly  arrested except for Kilgore. He had been living in South Africa and remained at large for nearly another year.

On November 7, 2002, Olson, the Harrises, and Bortin pleaded guilty to reduced second-degree murder charges. The Harrises had divorced and Emily took back her surname of Montague. She admitted to holding the murder weapon but said that the shotgun had gone off accidentally. Hearst had earlier said that Montague had dismissed the murder at the time saying, "She was a bourgeois pig anyway. Her husband is a doctor." In court, Montague denied having said this. She added, "I do not want [the Opsahl family] to believe that we ever considered her life insignificant."

Sentences were handed down on February 14, 2003, in Sacramento for the four defendants in the Opsahl murder case. Montague was sentenced to eight years for second degree murder. Her former husband, William Harris, was sentenced to seven years, and Bortin to six years. Olson was sentenced to six years, adding two consecutively to the 14-year sentence she had already received. All sentences were the maximum allowed under their plea bargains.

On November 8, 2002, James Kilgore was arrested in South Africa after having been a fugitive since 1975. He was extradited to the United States to face federal explosives and passport fraud charges. Prosecutors alleged that a pipe bomb had been found in Kilgore's apartment in 1975 and that he had obtained a passport under a false name. He pleaded guilty to the charges in 2003.

Sara Jane Olson was expecting to receive a sentence of 5 years and 4 months, but "in stiffening Olson's sentence ..., the prison board turned to a seldom-used section of state law, allowing it to recalculate sentences for old crimes in light of new, tougher sentencing guidelines." Olson was sentenced to 14 years— later reduced to 13 years—plus six years for her role in the Opsahl killing. Hearst had immunity because she was a state's witness. But the plea bargains meant that no trial was held, and she never testified on this case.

On April 26, 2004, Kilgore was sentenced to 54 months in prison for the explosives and passport fraud charges. He was the last remaining SLA member to face federal prosecution.

After serving six years of her prison sentence, Sarah Jane Olson was released on parole. She reunited with her family in California on March 17, 2008. But after a discovery that her release was premature because of a clerical error, she was arrested at Los Angeles International Airport and notified that her right to travel out of state had been rescinded. She was returned to prison for a year.

On March 17, 2009, Sarah Olson was released after serving seven years of her 14-year sentence. She was to check in with her parole officer in Los Angeles where it would be determined if she would be allowed to serve her parole in St. Paul, Minnesota, with her husband and three daughters. Several officials, including the Governor of Minnesota, urged that she serve her parole in California, but she was finally allowed to return to Minnesota and serve it there.

On May 10, 2009, James Kilgore was released from prison in California.

As of 2016, founding member Joseph Remiro remains incarcerated, serving a life sentence for the murder of Marcus Foster. He is the only SLA member still in prison and was up for parole in 2019.

Known members

Founding members
 Russell Little (SLA pseudonym Osceola or Osi), arrested and convicted for the shooting of Marcus Foster. Little was in custody during the time when Patty Hearst was with the SLA. Little was sentenced to life in prison in April 1975, but in 1981 he was retried and acquitted of the Foster murder. He now lives in Hawaii.
 Joseph Remiro (Bo), arrested with Russell Little and convicted of Foster's fatal shooting. Little and Remiro were the prisoners whom the SLA wanted exchanged for Hearst. Remiro was sentenced to life in prison in April 1975. He is serving the sentence at Pelican Bay State Prison, Crescent City, California. With repeated rejections of requests for parole, he is the only member of the SLA still in prison.
 Donald DeFreeze (General Field Marshal Cinque Mtume), an escaped prisoner, committed suicide during a police shootout in Los Angeles on May 17, 1974
 William (Willie) Wolfe (Kahjoh), killed in LAPD shootout on May 17, 1974
 Thero Wheeler (Bayo), left the SLA after rejecting their turn to armed conflict and receiving death threats from DeFreeze
 Mary Alice Siem, Wheeler's girfriend, left the SLA after receiving death threats from DeFreeze
 Angela Atwood (General Gelina), killed in LAPD shootout on May 17, 1974
 Patricia Soltysik, alias Mizmoon Soltysik (Zoya), major theorist with Perry, killed in LAPD shootout on May 17, 1974
 Camilla Hall (Gabi), Soltysik's lover, killed in LAPD shootout on May 17, 1974
 Nancy Ling Perry (Fahizah), major theorist with Soltysik, killed in LAPD shootout on May 17, 1974
 Emily Harris (Yolanda), imprisoned for Hearst kidnapping and bank robbery murder, paroled in February 2007. 
 William Harris (General Teko), Emily Harris's husband and eventual leader of the SLA, imprisoned for Hearst kidnapping and bank murder, paroled in September 2006.

Later members (after the Hearst kidnapping)
 Patty Hearst ("Tania"), kidnapped and became a member of  SLA. Arrested in 1975 and imprisoned for robbery, released in 1979, pardoned in 2001. 
 Wendy Yoshimura, former member of the Revolutionary Army, a violent activist group, with her friend Willie Brandt. Convicted and imprisoned for bank robbery and murder with the SLA, later paroled.  
 Kathleen Ann Soliah, (alias Sara Jane Olson) a friend of Atwood. Soliah became more involved after her friend Atwood's death in the LAPD 1974 shootout. After being arrested in 1999 after decades as a fugitive, she pleaded guilty for charges related to her role in explosives intended for bombing the LAPD, and a bank robbery and murder, and served seven years of a 14-year sentence before gaining parole in 2009. 
 Jim (James) Kilgore, Kathleen Soliah's boyfriend at the time, currently a research scholar at the Center for African Studies at the University of Illinois.  
 Steven Soliah, brother to Kathleen Soliah.
 Michael Bortin, married to Josephine Soliah, sister to Kathleen Soliah.

Associates and sympathizers
 Josephine Soliah, Kathleen Soliah's sister
 Bonnie Jean Wilder, Seanna, Sally (a friend of Remiro's), and Bridget. All are mentioned in Hearst's book Every Secret Thing as potential members.
 Micki and Jack Scott. Rented a farmhouse in Pennsylvania. Jack Scott participated in transportation of fugitive SLA members to different parts of the US, including his farmhouse. He volunteered to shelter them in hopes of writing a book on them with their cooperation. Scott, sports editor for the radical magazine Ramparts, died in 2000.

In the media
The SLA distributed photographs, news releases and radio-quality taped interviews in which they explained their past activities to the press.  The Bay Area Research Collective was formed as an above-ground support group for the SLA, and distributed a mimeographed newsletter, The Dragon.  Since that time the SLA's activities have been covered in other ways in the media. These include films and television shows, such as:

 Abduction (1975), directed by Joseph Zito (based on Black Abductors by Harrison James)
 Tanya (1976), directed by Nate Rodgers (also known as Sex Queen of the SLA)
 Patty (1976), directed by Robert L. Roberts
 The Ordeal of Patty Hearst (1979) (TV)
 Patty Hearst (1988), directed by Paul Schrader, based on Hearst's autobiography Every Secret Thing
 Citizen Tania (1989), written and directed by artist Raymond Pettibon
 Guerrilla: The Taking of Patty Hearst (2004), directed by Robert Stone (It was released under the alternate title Neverland: The Rise and Fall of the Symbionese Liberation Army.)
 The Radical Story of Patty Hearst (2018) (TV); the Cable News Network produced a six-part docuseries on Patty Hearst. It featured on-air statements by several former members of the SLA. The report also contained several statements by Jeffrey Toobin, author of the American Heiress: The Wild Saga of the Kidnapping, Crimes and Trial of Patty Hearst. The docuseries indirectly adapts Toobin's book as part of the report.
 The freeware game Liberal Crime Squad by Tarn Adams, better known as the developer of Dwarf Fortress, is a satirical game that allows the player to change policies through the methods of the SLA in order to win the game.

Patti Smith's 1974 single of Jimi Hendrix's 1960s song "Hey Joe" begins with a salacious and provocative monologue about Patty Hearst and the SLA, which puts a feminist spin on the lyrics that had been written about a man who murders his adulterous wife and then flees to Mexico.

Honey, the way you play guitar makes me feel so... makes me feel so...masochistic. The way you go down low deep into the neck... and I would do anything... and I would do anything. And Patty Hearst, you standing there in front of the Symbionese Liberation Army flag with your legs spread. I was wondering: were you gettin' it every night from a black revolutionary man and his women? Or were you really dead? And now that you're on the run, what goes on in your mind? Your sisters they sit by the window. You know, your mama does sit and cry. And your daddy—well, you know what your daddy said Patty. You know what your daddy said, Patty? He said... he said... he said.... "Well, sixty days ago she was such a lovely child. Now here she is, with a gun in her hand.

Thus, Smith's version effectively casts Patty Hearst in the role of Joe "with a gun in her hand"—a violent criminal rebelling against the law and all civil authority. Before the fadeout, Smith sings in the voice of Hearst angrily repudiating both her privileged upbringing as well as the mainstream society which has condemned her as a spoiled, vacuous "pretty little rich girl" who became a terrorist. This particular recording was made when Patty Hearst was still a fugitive and members of the SLA were still at large.

The 1976 film Network features a Maoist insurgent group, the Ecumenical Liberation Army. Although the film distinguishes it from the SLA, it is plainly a parody of the group and its relationship with the television business. Over the course of the film, the ELA kidnaps an heiress and reeducates her into the group, robs a bank, and negotiates with the titular network for its own prime-time program, The Mao Tse-Tung Hour.

The Norwegian rock band Turbonegro included the seven-headed cobra symbol on the front cover of their 1998 album Apocalypse Dudes.

The episode "Inheritance" from the CBS action-drama series S.W.A.T. focuses on the group of criminals with nearly similar motives and tactics as the SLA, later identified as The Emancipators.

The Horror punk band Misfits have a song named "She" on their debut album Static Age which is about the Patty Hearst case and the ensuing controversy.

References

Further reading 
 Boulton, David. The Making of Tania Hearst. Bergenfield, N.J.: New American Library, 1975. 224+[12] pp., ill., ports., facsim., index, 22 cm. Also published: London: New English Library, 1975.
 Hearst, Patty, with Alvin Moscow, Patty Hearst: Her Own Story. New York: Avon, 1982. . (Original title: Every Secret Thing.)
 McLellan, Vin, and Paul Avery. The Voices of Guns: The Definitive and Dramatic Story of the Twenty-two-month Career of the Symbionese Liberation Army. New York: Putnam, 1977.
 Weed, Steven, with Scott Swanton. My Search for Patty Hearst. New York: Warner, 1976. (Weed was Hearst's fiancé at the time of the kidnapping. That was the end of their relationship.)
King, John Brian (editor). Death to the Fascist Insect. Sacramento: Spurl Editions, 2019.

External links

 Directed by Robert Stone, 2004
 "Guerrilla: The Taking of Patty Hearst"  official web site for the PBS movie about SLA
The Symbionese Liberation Army; House Committee on Internal Security report
The Other Parts Left out of the Patty Hearst Trial by Paul Krassner
Death to the Fascist Insect, a compilation of the writings and transcribed recordings of the Symbionese Liberation Army
The Political and Social Program of the SLA Manifesto (redacted 1974)
Stuart A. Rose Manuscript, Archives, and Rare Book Library, Emory University: Symbionese Liberation Army collection, 1973-1974

 
Crimes in the San Francisco Bay Area
1973 establishments in California
1975 disestablishments in the United States
American bank robbers
Terrorism in the United States